Diana Lemešová (born 4 October 2000) is a Slovak footballer who plays as a defender for SKN St. Pölten and the Slovakia national team.

Club career
On 3 August 2018, she transferred from Slovakia to Austria to play in the ÖFB-Frauenliga for USC Landhaus.

As of 2022, she plays for SKN St. Pölten.

International career
Lemešová made her debut for the Slovakia national team on 18 February 2021, coming on as a substitute for Patrícia Hmírová against Malta.

References

2000 births
Living people
Women's association football defenders
Slovak women's footballers
Slovakia women's international footballers
USC Landhaus Wien players
ÖFB-Frauenliga players
Expatriate women's footballers in Austria
Slovak expatriate sportspeople in Austria